KPSU may refer to:

KPSU (FM), a defunct radio station (91.7 FM), formerly licensed to serve Goodwell, Oklahoma
KPSU, student-operated station at Portland State University, Oregon